Katvari Parish is an administrative unit of Limbaži Municipality, Latvia.

Towns, villages and settlements of Katvari Parish

References 

Parishes of Latvia
Limbaži Municipality